Verkhnii Rohachyk is an urban-type settlement in Kakhovka Raion, Kherson Oblast, southern Ukraine. It hosts the administration of Verkhnii Rohachyk settlement hromada, one of the hromadas of Ukraine. The settlement is located on the banks of the Rohachyk River, a left tributary of the Dnieper. It has a population of

Administrative status 
Until 18 July, 2020, Verkhnii Rohachyk was the administrative center of Verkhnii Rohachyk Raion. The raion was abolished in July 2020 as part of the administrative reform of Ukraine, which reduced the number of raions of Kherson Oblast to five. The area of Verkhnii Rohachyk Raion was merged into Kakhovka Raion.

Economy

Transportation
Verkhnii Rohachyk is connected by roads to Nyzhni Sirohozy and Kamianka-Dniprovska, with further access to Zaporizhzhia, Kherson, and Henichesk.

See also 

 Russian occupation of Kherson Oblast

References

Urban-type settlements in Kakhovka Raion